Ascon and ASCON may refer to:
 Ascon (cipher), a lightweight cipher
 Asconoid, a wall structure of sponges; 
 The original name of Ascaron, the now-defunct German company
 ASCON, a Russian company
 The Occitan name for Ascou, a French commune